Wrestling at the 2005 Southeast Asian Games took place in the San Andres Gymnasium in San Andres, Manila, Philippines. The event was split into two disciplines, Freestyle and Greco-Roman which are further divided into different weight categories. Men competed in both disciplines whereas women only took part in the Freestyle event with 12 gold medals being contested in all.

Medal winners
Free

External links
Southeast Asian Games Official Results
 Wrestling sweep possible, says Valta. Philippine Star. November 28, 2005.
 SEAG DAY 4:  RP  BREAKS  AWAY  WITH  58  GOLDS. Philippine Star. December 1, 2005
 Pinoy grapplers grab 3 more golds. Philippine Star. December 1, 2005.

2005 Southeast Asian Games events
2005
Southeast Asian Games